The women's 200 metre individual medley event at the 2018 Asian Games took place on 24 August at the Gelora Bung Karno Aquatic Stadium.

Schedule
All times are Western Indonesia Time (UTC+07:00)

Records

Results
Legend
DNS — Did not start

Heats

Final

References

Swimming at the 2018 Asian Games